Mount Dearborn is a mountain in the Head Mountains,  high, between Mount Littlepage and the northern part of the Willett Range, in Victoria Land. It was named by the Advisory Committee on Antarctic Names in 1964, for John Dearborn, a biologist at McMurdo Station, 1959 and 1961.

References
 

Mountains of Victoria Land
Scott Coast